BRD Tower is a class A office building located in the city of Bucharest, Romania. It has 19 floors, containing a total of 37,000 m2 floor space, making it one of the largest office buildings in Bucharest. There are an additional 3 floors underground that serve as parking space.

See also
BRD Tower Cluj-Napoca

References

External links
Official site

Skyscraper office buildings in Bucharest
Société Générale
Office buildings completed in 2003